This article contains a list of encyclicals of Pope Benedict XIV. The documents below were all written by Benedict XIV.

External links
 List of encyclicals of Pope Benedict XIV collected on page vatican.va with their full texts 
 List of encyclicals of Pope Benedict XIV collected on papalencyclicals.net (fragments) 
 Text of encyclical Demandatam coelitus humilitati nostrae 
 Text of encyclical Vix pervenit 

Documents of Pope Benedict XIV
Benedict 14